Edward Siegfried Hengel  (September 16, 1855 – November 4, 1927) was a professional baseball player, manager, umpire. He is best known for managing the Chicago Browns/Pittsburgh Stogies, a team in the major league Union Association that only operated in 1884.

Biography
Hengel served as a single-season manager for four different teams, three of them in the minor leagues. His minor league teams were the Quincy Quincys (Quincy, Illinois) of the Northwestern League in 1883, the Hastings Hustlers (Hastings, Nebraska) of the Western League in 1887, and the Hamilton, Ohio, team of the Tri-State League in 1889. Records for these minor league teams are incomplete. Baseball records further indicate that Hengel also appeared as a player for Hamilton in 1889, but no statistics are available.

In 1884, the only season of the Union Association, considered to have been a major league, Hengel was the first manager of the Chicago Browns/Pittsburgh Stogies. He compiled a record of 34–39 in 74 games, before he was replaced by Joe Battin.

Hengel also served as a major league umpire during two seasons; 11 games in the National League in 1886, and 20 games in the American Association in 1889. He ejected two players, both in 1889; Mark Baldwin and Oyster Burns.  He was also reported as being an umpire in the minor Northwestern League during 1883. His umpiring was described as "uniformly good" in 1886.

Born in Chicago in 1855, Hengel died at age 72 in 1927 in Norwich, England. A brother, Moxie Hengel, was a major league second baseman.

Notes

References

External links

Managerial and Umpiring career statistics at Retrosheet

1927 deaths
1855 births
Sportspeople from Chicago
Major League Baseball managers
Hamilton (minor league baseball) players
Major League Baseball umpires
Baseball players from Chicago